Herina parva is a species of picture-winged fly in the genus Herina of the family Ulidiidae found in Austria, France, Germany, and Spain.

References

Ulidiidae
Insects described in 1864
Diptera of Europe
Taxa named by Hermann Loew